Cartoonito is a British pay television channel which targets children between the ages of 3 and 6. It is run by Warner Bros. Discovery under its International division.

History

Launch (2006–2007) 

On August 14, 2006, the Turner Broadcasting System announced they would launch a new pre-school-oriented block for Cartoon Network Too known as Cartoonito, which would launch on 4 September 2006, running from 6 AM to 3 PM.

Relaunch as full channel (2007–present)

On 2 May 2007, Turner announced that they would expand Cartoonito to a full-time network on 24 May 2007. This allowed for Cartoon Network Too to merge and replace Toonami, allowing the full Cartoonito channel to launch in the ex-Cartoon Network Too slot. The channel ran between 3 AM and 7 PM in a time-sharing agreement with Turner Classic Movies 2 (later became Turner Classic Movies +1 after 13 August 2013).

On August 28, 2009, it was announced that a Cartoonito block would air on Boomerang from 9:00am-10:30am on school-term weekdays beginning in September. The aim of the block was to introduce the Cartoonito brand to viewers who had never seen the programmes the channel offered.

On 25 March 2010, Cartoonito was added to Virgin Media. For the launch, the channel's runtime was changed, now running from 4 AM to 8 PM. On 26 October 2013, Cartoonito was launched on BT TV, and Cartoonito launched on Plusnet in May 2015. On 15 December 2016, Cartoonito was added to TalkTalk.

Introduction of 24-hour service (2017–present) 
Cartoonito shifted its aspect ratio to 16:9 widescreen on 1 November 2017. The channel moved to a full 24-hour schedule on 15 January 2018. On 2 March 2018, the channel was announced for a rebrand with an updated website. The logo remained the same, with the only difference being that the eyes were changed from purple to black.

Rebrand and block relaunch (2022–present) 
On 1 February 2022, the channel rebranded with the new 2021 logo and bumpers. Following the rebrand, a Cartoonito block launched on its sister channel Cartoon Network, airing weekdays from 9 to 10 AM (was briefly extend to end at 11 AM from Spring until the Summer of 2022).

Availability

Cable
Virgin Media : Channel 706

Online
Now TV: Watch live

Satellite
Sky: Channel 610

Terrestrial
BT : Channel 471

Programming

See also 
 Cartoon Network Too
 Cartoonito (brand)
 Boomerang (UK & Ireland)
 Cartoon Network
 CNX
 Toonami (UK & Ireland)

References

External links 
 

Cartoonito
2006 establishments in England
Children's television networks
Children's television channels in the United Kingdom
Preschool education television networks
Television channels and stations established in 2006
Television programming blocks in Europe
Turner Broadcasting System Europe
Turner Broadcasting System UK & Ireland
Warner Bros. Discovery EMEA